Zygmunt Eugeniusz Weiss (4 April 1903 – 4 June 1977) was a Polish sprinter and sport journalist. He competed at the 1924 and 1928 Summer Olympics. During World War II, Weiss fought in the September Campaign after Poland was invaded by Nazi Germany.

References

External links
 

1903 births
1977 deaths
Athletes (track and field) at the 1924 Summer Olympics
Athletes (track and field) at the 1928 Summer Olympics
Polish male sprinters
Olympic athletes of Poland
Athletes from Warsaw
People from Warsaw Governorate
Polish military personnel of World War II
20th-century Polish journalists
20th-century Polish people